Brad Divens is an American rock musician.  He was the bassist and lead vocalist for Souls at Zero, formerly known as Wrathchild America. His vocal style often draws comparisons to James Hetfield (Metallica). Previously, Brad played guitar with the Maryland band Kix on their Cool Kids album.

He has since worked as Front of House's sound engineer for acts such as Linkin Park, Cyndi Lauper, Garbage, HIM, Bob Seger and the Silver Bullet Band, Mötley Crüe, Jane's Addiction, and most recently Enrique Iglesias.

Discography
Kix
Cool Kids (1983)

Wrathchild America
Climbin' the Walls (1989)
3-D (1991)
Souls at Zero 
Souls at Zero (1993)
Six-T-Six (EP) (1994)
A Taste for the Perverse

References 

Living people
American heavy metal singers
American heavy metal bass guitarists
American male bass guitarists
Wrathchild America members
Souls at Zero (band) members
Year of birth missing (living people)